Bulrush or bullrush is a common name for any of several wetland plants, mostly in the sedge family, Cyperaceae.

Bulrush may also refer to:
 HMS Bullrush (K307), former name of HMCS Mimico (K485)
 Bullrush (game), a variation of the tag and running game British Bulldog
 "Bull-Rush", a song by Paul Weller from the 1992 album Paul Weller
 Bullrush, one of eleven Reedling keelboats
 Bullrush, a technique by mixed martial artist Bob Sapp

See also
 Ark of bulrushes, in which the infant Moses was found
 Task Force Bullrush, a task force led by the 15th Marine Expeditionary Unit in Iraq in 2006 and 2007
 Bulrush Lake (disambiguation)